The Gladbeck hostage crisis or Gladbeck hostage drama was a bank robbery and hostage-taking that took place in West Germany from 16 to 18 August 1988. Two men with prior criminal records – Hans-Jürgen Rösner and Dieter Degowski – robbed a branch of the Deutsche Bank in Gladbeck, North Rhine-Westphalia, taking two employees as hostages. During their flight, they were joined by Rösner's girlfriend Marion Löblich, with whom they hijacked a public transport bus in Bremen. With twenty-seven hostages aboard, they drove towards the Netherlands, where all but two hostages were released and the bus was exchanged for a getaway car. The hostage-taking was finally ended when the police rammed the getaway car on the A3 motorway near Bad Honnef, North Rhine-Westphalia.

During the hostage crisis, a 14-year-old boy and an 18-year-old woman were killed. A third victim, a 31-year-old police officer, died in a traffic accident while chasing the hostage-takers. At the time, the unfolding of events was extensively covered by West German media, which quickly spiraled into a media circus. In the aftermath of the hostage crisis, journalists have been criticised for conducting interviews with the hostage-takers, asking them to pose for photographs, and aiding them by giving them, among other things, coffee and road directions. This resulted in the German Press Council banning any future interviews with hostage-takers during hostage situations.

Perpetrators

Hans-Jürgen Rösner 
Hans-Jürgen "Hanusch" Rösner was born on 17 February 1957 in Gladbeck. He grew up in a family with three older sisters and one younger sister. His father, who was a World War II veteran, was often violent and physically abused him throughout his childhood. At the age of 8 or 9, an acquaintance of his father's reportedly taught him to shoplift. His first conviction for theft was at the age of 14.

By his late 20s, Rösner had already committed numerous thefts and burglaries, and had spent a total of eleven years in prison. In August 1986, he disappeared while on parole and went into hiding at his sister's house. One year later, he moved in with his girlfriend, Marion Löblich, and her teenaged daughter Nicole, in an apartment in the neighborhood of Rentfort-Nord. The police, having been tipped by Rösner's ex-wife Ursula regarding his whereabouts, planned to arrest him on 16 August 1988 – the day of the bank robbery and hostage-taking.

Dieter Degowski 
Dieter Degowski was born on 4 June 1956 in Gladbeck; he was the fifth child in a family of six children. Like Rösner, he experienced domestic abuse as a child, causing him to develop a violent and anti-social character. The two met while attending a primary school for special education. In his early teens, he regularly committed minor crimes, such as shoplifting, and was first arrested at the age of 15 for stealing sedative drugs. He later started stealing cars, and developed an alcohol and Vesparax addiction.

In 1983, Rösner and Degowski crossed paths again when they shared a cell in Werl Prison for eight months. Shortly before the bank robbery in August 1988, Degowski agreed to be Rösner's accomplice on the premise that they would use the money to establish their own car recycling business near Münster. Degowski's IQ was assessed at 79.

Marion Löblich 
Marion Irma Löblich was born on 14 April 1954 in Bremen; she was the second of eight children. During her childhood, her parents often coped with financial problems. In her late teens, she became pregnant with her first child and married the father. Some time after the birth of her daughter Leila, who is intellectually disabled, she caught her husband cheating with her best friend. She applied for a divorce in 1975, while pregnant with her second daughter, Nicole.

One year later, she married her second husband in Duisburg; they moved to Gladbeck and opened a bar. There, she met Ralf Löblich and divorced her husband in 1978 to marry a third time. In 1980, she gave birth to a son, named Pierre. The couple worked as taxi drivers for some time, but unsatisfied with her marriage, Löblich eventually left her husband to start a relationship with Hans-Jürgen Rösner.

Timeline

16 August
In the early morning two armed and hooded offenders broke into a branch of the Deutsche Bank in the district of Rentfort-Nord in Gladbeck before opening hours.

At 8:04 am, an emergency call was made by a witness to the police. A parked police car was seen by the offenders as they left the branch. They went back into the bank and took two clerks hostage, demanding a car and ransom money, firing their guns into the air several times.  

A radio station was the first to conduct an interview with them as the hostage crisis was happening. After several hours of negotiations, the abductors were given 300,000 DM and a white Audi 100 as a getaway car. At 9:45 pm, the getaway started. The robbers took two bank employees with them as hostages.  Marion Löblich, the girlfriend of Hans-Jürgen Rösner (who was one of the robbers), boarded the car in Gladbeck.

17 August
After driving on the autobahn to Bremen, the abductors stopped in the district of Huckelriede and hijacked a public-transit bus with 32 passengers at 7:00 pm on 17 August. The media interviewed the abductors and the hostages without any interference from the police. Some hostages even had a pistol pressed against their throats.

After the release of five hostages, the bus was driven to the autobahn service area of Grundbergsee. The two bank clerks were released there.

Two police officers arrested Löblich, who was using the toilet. Demanding an exchange, Degowski and Rösner threatened to kill a hostage every five minutes. After the expiration of the ultimatum they shot a 14-year-old Italian boy, Emanuele De Giorgi, in the head; he was said to be protecting his sister. Löblich was about to be released by the police on demand of the abductors but arrived too late because of a broken handcuff key and poor police communication. An ambulance arrived 20 minutes later, but the shot teenager died two hours later in hospital.

After this incident the bus was driven towards Oldenzaal in the Netherlands. During the chase a police car collided with a truck, leaving one police officer dead and another injured.

18 August
At 2:30 am on 18 August 1988, the bus crossed the border into the Netherlands. At 5:15 am two women and three children were released, after the Dutch police refused to negotiate as long as children were being held hostage. At 6:30 am Rösner and Degowski got a BMW 735i. The getaway car had been prepared by the police so that the engine could be stopped by remote control. While attempting to escape, Löblich and the bus driver were injured.

During a stop in Wuppertal the abductors went shopping in a pharmacy.

After stopping in a pedestrian area in Cologne at 10:30 am, the car was surrounded by media and shoppers. Some reporters offered to guide the abductors on their way or to hand them pictures of police officers to prevent trickery if hostages were exchanged. A reporter, Udo Röbel, guided the abductors to a nearby rest area on the autobahn and accompanied them for several kilometres.

On the A3 close to Bad Honnef, a few kilometres before the state border between North Rhine-Westphalia and Rhineland-Palatinate, a police car rammed the getaway car at 1:40 pm and rendered it immobile, triggering a gunfight. One of the hostages was able to exit the car. However, Silke Bischoff, 18, was fatally shot in the heart and died. After that the abductors were arrested.

The remote control to stop the car engine was not used since the police officers had forgotten to take it with them. Across the state border, a special task force (GSG9) was in position waiting to take action.

Aftermath
On 22 March, 1991 Rösner and Degowski were pronounced guilty by the regional superior court of Essen and received life sentences. Löblich was sentenced to nine years. In 2002 the Higher Court in Hamm ascertained "guilt of a very serious nature" and Degowski's sentence was increased to 24 years. In 2004 the same Higher Court refused an application for parole and a request by Rösner to shorten his sentence. The court also declared a state of "preventive detention" ("Sicherungsverwahrung") and therefore Rösner is unlikely to be freed after the end of his sentence.

On 20 November 1988, the Minister of the Interior of Bremen Bernd Meyer resigned over mistakes by the police.

Several years after the incident, there was a public discussion at a local police academy about the incident with the judge who had sentenced Rösner and Degowski to life in prison and journalists including Udo Röbel, a reporter who had got into the vehicle with the hostage-takers and went with them, giving them directions out of Cologne. The judge praised Röbel for having prevented a potential bloodbath in Cologne by getting into the car. This was not a view expressed in the official report into the incident by a parliamentary enquiry in the state of the North Rhine Westphalia, which commented negatively on the journalists' ethics.

In August 2018 it was announced by the regional court in Arnsberg that Dieter Degowski was to be released on conditional parole after serving 30 years in prison.

Media conduct
This was the first incident in Germany with direct interference by representatives of the media. The media were severely criticised for their handling of this situation and for conducting interviews with hostages (one of the journalists acting this way was Frank Plasberg). As a result, the German Press Council (Deutscher Presserat) banned any future interviews with hostage-takers during hostage situations.  The head of Germany's largest journalists' union (DJV), Michael Konken, has referred to the incident as "the darkest hour of German journalism since the end of WWII".

Media

A two-part dramatisation of the events, titled 54 Hours, was broadcast by ARD in March 2018. The Australian crime podcast Casefile also covered the case in March 2021.

A documentary titled Gladbeck: The Hostage Crisis was released in 2022 on Netflix, documenting the events throughout the entire 54 hours using raw footage, without commentary.

See also 
 1973 Stockholm hostage crisis
 1975 Wijster train hijacking
 1977 De Punt train hijacking
 1988 Ordzhonikidze bus hijacking

References

External links
 Deutsche Welle: The Gladbeck Hostage Drama
 NY Times: Hostage Dies as German Drama Ends, published on 8/19/88
 NY Times: Killings in German Hostage Incident Stir Dispute, published on 8/28/88
 http://rhein-zeitung.de/on/98/08/11/topnews/glad1.html Ten years after. News story with pictures and links 
 http://www.focus.de/panorama/welt/gladbeck-ich-war-feige_aid_323612.html 
 BBC News: Gladbeck: The deadly hostage drama where the media crossed a line, published on 8/20/18

1988 in West Germany
1988 crimes in Germany
1988 crimes in the Netherlands
1980s in North Rhine-Westphalia
1980s in Cologne
August 1988 events in Europe
Bank robberies
Crime in North Rhine-Westphalia
Crime in Lower Saxony
Crime in Cologne
Deaths by firearm in Germany
Hijacking
History of Bremen (city)
History of Overijssel
Hostage taking in Germany
Hostage taking in the Netherlands
Recklinghausen (district)
Oldenzaal
Bad Honnef
Television controversies in Germany